Maria "Marie" Johanna Philipsen-Braun (22 June 1911 – 23 June 1982), also known as Zus Braun, was a Dutch swimmer. She competed in the 1928 Summer Olympics in Amsterdam and in 1932 in Los Angeles, winning a gold medal in the 100 m backstroke and a silver in the 400 m freestyle in 1928. She failed to reach the finals of these events at the 1932 Games due to a sudden illness during the preliminary heats. During her career Braun set six world and 25 national records.

Braun was the daughter of the prominent Dutch swimming coach Ma Braun. She had her first international success at the 1927 European Championships, where she won one gold and two bronze medals in the 100 m and 4 × 100 m freestyle and 100 m backstroke. She won gold medals in these events at the next European championships in 1931. After these wins snd her medals at the 1928 Olympics, Braun was a favorite at the 1932 Olympics. However  after swimming 400 m heats she was hospitalized with a strong fever, and retired from swimming shortly after that. In 1980, she was inducted into the International Swimming Hall of Fame.

Suspected poisoning
During the 1932 Olympic swimming competition in Los Angeles, Braun suddenly became very ill and was hospitalized for three weeks with a high fever. When she returned to Nederlands, she gave a press statement stating that between events, she suddenly felt a pain in her leg and that two young American men who had been sitting in front of her in the stands and had been watching her suspiciously, "disappeared". There was a suspicion this was linked to illegal gambling on the final events.

See also
 List of members of the International Swimming Hall of Fame

References

1911 births
1982 deaths
Dutch female freestyle swimmers
Dutch female backstroke swimmers
Olympic gold medalists for the Netherlands
Olympic silver medalists for the Netherlands
Olympic swimmers of the Netherlands
Swimmers at the 1928 Summer Olympics
Swimmers at the 1932 Summer Olympics
Swimmers from Rotterdam
Medalists at the 1928 Summer Olympics
European Aquatics Championships medalists in swimming
Olympic gold medalists in swimming
Olympic silver medalists in swimming
20th-century Dutch women